Musket Island Marine Provincial Park is a provincial park in British Columbia, Canada, located on the west side of Nelson Island, at the mouth of Jervis Inlet and near Earl's Cove in the Sunshine Coast region.

References

musket_ps.pdf Musket Island Marine Provincial Park Purpose Statement and Zoning Plan, BC Parks, March 2003

Sunshine Coast (British Columbia)
Provincial parks of British Columbia
Islands of British Columbia
1992 establishments in British Columbia
Protected areas established in 1992
Marine parks of Canada